Heifetz is a Jewish surname from Belarus and Lithuania. It derives from Hebrew חפץ (chefets; "delight" "pleasure"). It is unrelated to the similar-sounding Arabic name حافظ (Hafez or Hafiz; guardian, protector). It is also spelled Chafets, Chaffetz, Chaifetz, Cheifetz, Chejfec, Chofets.  It may refer to:

 Ze'ev Chafets, American-Israeli author and columnist
 Jason Chaffetz (born 1967), a U.S. Representative from Utah
 Hammond Chaffetz (1907-2001), a U.S. federal prosecutor and partner at Kirkland & Ellis
 Jill Chaifetz (1964-2006), an American lawyer and children's rights advocate
 Sergio Chejfec (1956-2022), an American-Argentine writer. 
 Jonathon Hafetz, American lawyer and writer
 Daniel Heifetz (born 1948), concert violinist and founder of the Heifetz International Music Institute (brother of Ronald L. Heifetz)
 Danny Heifetz, American musician, percussionist, grandson of Jascha Heifetz
 Jascha Heifetz (1901-1987), Lithuanian-born American violinist
 Ronald L. Heifetz, American leadership teacher
 Yuri Heifetz, Russian poet and singer-songwriter
 Grigory Kheifets, Soviet intelligence agent
 Iosif Kheifits, Soviet film director
 Chofetz Chaim, (1838–1933), popular name of Rabbi Yisrael Meir ha-Kohen Kagan, Lithuanian rabbi and posek

Surnames
Hebrew-language surnames
Jewish surnames
Yiddish-language surnames